Professor Frank Morgan  (born 1952) is a British academic. He was the first Vice-Chancellor of Bath Spa University, and retired from that post as of December 2011. He was named an Officer of the OBE (OBE) for services to Higher Education in the 2012 New Year Honours.

While he was vice-chancellor, the Bath College of Higher Education (the university's former name) became a university college in 1999 and a university in 2005. He was vice-chancellor for 15 years, and worked at the university for 25 years.

References 

1953 births
Living people
Vice-Chancellors of Bath Spa University
Officers of the Order of the British Empire
Place of birth missing (living people)